Nino and the Ebb Tides were a doo-wop musical group based in the Bronx, New York, formed in 1956.

Their first recording, Franny Franny (credited to "The Ebb Tides"), was the result of meeting talent scout Murray Jacobs in 1957 and was widely played by Alan Freed.

Later releases were on Jacobs' newly formed Recorte Records, before the group moved on to Madison Records.

One of their recordings, "Juke Box Saturday Night", was a cover of a Glenn Miller tune. On September 4, 1961, their "Juke Box Saturday Night" charted on Billboard's Top 100, reaching number 57.

The group was managed by Ralph Fusco, also from the Bronx, NY.

References

Musical groups established in 1956
Doo-wop groups
Musical groups from the Bronx
1956 establishments in New York City